Diana Hilary Coole (born 1952)  is Professor of Political and Social Theory in the School of Politics and Sociology, Birkbeck, University of London. Her main field of research covers, broadly, contemporary continental philosophy with special interests in poststructuralism (especially Foucault), and feminism and gender in political thought. Coole also sits on the editorial boards of several journals including Contemporary Political Theory and the European Journal of Political Theory.

Publications

See also 

 Michel Foucault
 Immanuel Kant
 Maurice Merleau-Ponty
 Materialism (economic)
 Ontology
 Phenomenology
 Political philosophy
 Poststructuralism

References

External links
 Diana Coole, Birkbeck, University of London

Academics of Birkbeck, University of London
Living people
1952 births
Phenomenologists
British political philosophers
British women non-fiction writers